Four Wants and One Without or Four Yeses and One No (Chinese: 四要一沒有) is a policy proposed by the former president of the Republic of China (commonly called "Taiwan"), Chen Shui-bian, in a speech at a function of the Formosan Association for Public Affairs on 4 March 2007.  The substance thereof is that:
 Taiwan wants independence;
 Taiwan wants the rectification of its name;
 Taiwan wants a new constitution;
 Taiwan wants development; and 
 Taiwanese politics is without the question of left or right, but only the question of unification or independence.

See also
Four Ifs
Four Noes and One Without

External links
full text of Chen's speech at FAPA

Politics of Taiwan